Sihui (四会市) is a county-level city in Guangdong, China.

Sihui may also refer to:

Sihui, Beijing (四惠), a transportation node in Beijing
Sihui station
Sihui East station

See also
Siwei Subdistrict